The Americas Zone was one of the four zones within Group 3 of the regional Davis Cup competition in 2015. The zone's competition was held in round robin format in Panama City, Panama, in July 2015. The nine competing nations were divided into one pool of four and one of five. The winners and runners up from each pool played off to determine the two nations to be promoted to Americas Zone Group II in 2016, while the third and fourth placed nations played to off to determine overall placings within the group.

Participating nations

Draw

The nine teams were divided into one pool of four and one of five. The winner of each pool plays off against the runner-up of the other pool, and the two winners of these play-offs are promoted to Americas Zone Group II in 2016. The third and fourth placed teams in each pool play off against the equivalent team from the other pool to determine overall rankings within the group. The fifth placed team in Pool B does not enter the play-offs.

The group was staged from the 20th to the 25th July 2015 at the Centro de Alto Rendimiento Fred Maduro in Panama City, Panama.

Pool A

Pool B

First round

Pool A

Paraguay vs. Panama

Honduras vs. Cuba

Honduras vs. Panama

Paraguay vs. Cuba

Cuba vs. Panama

Paraguay vs. Honduras

Pool B

Guatemala vs. Bahamas

Jamaica vs. Bermuda

Bahamas vs. Trinidad and Tobago

Guatemala vs. Jamaica

Bahamas vs. Bermuda

Guatemala vs. Trinidad and Tobago

Jamaica vs. Trinidad and Tobago

Guatemala vs. Bermuda

Bahamas vs. Jamaica

Bermuda vs. Trinidad and Tobago

Play-offs

Promotion

Paraguay vs. Jamaica

Guatemala vs. Cuba

5th place play-off: Honduras vs. Bahamas

7th place play-off: Panama vs. Trinidad and Tobago

Outcomes
 and  promoted to Americas Zone Group II in 2016

References

2015 Davis Cup Americas Zone
Davis Cup Americas Zone